DJ-Kicks: Nightmares on Wax is a DJ mix album, mixed by Nightmares on Wax, released on the Studio !K7 label as part of the DJ-Kicks series.

CD Cat number: !K7093CD
Vinyl Cat number: !K7093LP

CD Track List
Type - Slow Process  – 5:04
Only Child - Breakneck  – 2:13
Saukrates - Ay, Ay Studder  – 3:20
DJ Paul Nice - Break It Down  – 2:05
Grand Unified - Shake Up (Jaddle Remix)  – 4:05
Nightmares on Wax - Ease Jimi  – 2:06
Jerry Beeks - Flash $  – 1:56
D.I.T.C. - Thick  – 3:44
Nightmares on Wax - Burn Me Slow (featuring O.C. of D.I.T.C.)  – 1:57
Nightmares on Wax - Play On (featuring Corrina Joseph)  – 4:36
Kenny Dope - Get On Down  – 4:50
Kenny Dope - Superkat  – 3:09
A Tribe Called Quest - Award Tour  – 3:23
John Cameron - Swamp Fever  – 2:04
Blackalicious - Alphabet Aerobics  – 2:09
DJ Trax - This Place  – 4:50
Freddie Fresh - It's A Latin Thing  – 5:44
Aim - Underground Crownholders  – 1:48
Deckwrecka - Catchwrecka  – 2:07
Martin Brew - Sand Steppin  – 2:25
Smokers Blend - Overooped  – 3:35
Deadbeats - Pick Me Up  – 4:06
Syrup - Chocolate  – 5:21

LP Track List
Saukrates - Ay, Ay Studder
Jerry Beeks - Flash $
D.I.T.C. - Thick
Nightmares on Wax - Play On
Nightmares on Wax - Burn Me Slo
A Tribe Called Quest - Award Tour
Freddy Fresh - It's A Latin Thing
Deckwrecka - Catch Wrecka
Martin Brew - Sand Steppin'
Smokers Blend - Overooped
Deadbeats - Pick Me Up
DJ Paul Nice - Break It Down

References

External links
 
DJ-Kicks website

Nightmares On Wax
Nightmares on Wax albums
2000 compilation albums